Chloroacetophenone oxime is the oxime derivative of chloroacetophenone. It's produced by reaction of chloroacetophenone with hydroxylamine. It has powerful lachrymatory and irritant effects.

References

Lachrymatory agents
Ketoximes
Phenyl compounds
Organochlorides